Fred Ahern (3 April 1900 – 15 November 1958) was an Irish equestrian. He competed in two events at the 1948 Summer Olympics.

References

1900 births
1958 deaths
Irish male equestrians
Olympic equestrians of Ireland
Equestrians at the 1948 Summer Olympics